Koukinkuilga is a village in the Ramongo Department of Boulkiemdé Province in central western Burkina Faso. It has a population of 327.

References

Populated places in Boulkiemdé Province